Kegalle is a district in Sabaragamuwa Province, Sri Lanka. It is one of 25 districts of Sri Lanka, the second level administrative division of the country. The district is administered by a District Secretariat headed by a District Secretary (previously known as a Government Agent) appointed by the central government of Sri Lanka. It was a former Dissavani of Sri Lanka. 

The district has a population of 837,179 according to 2012 Census, which is approximately 4.0% of the total population of Sri Lanka.

Physical information
The District of Kegalle is situated in between the central highlands and western southern plains and has an enchanting environment. Rubber cultivation has stretched over most of the area of the District and minor export crops from the district include coffee, cocoa, pepper, clove and nutmeg. Sri Lanka's best graphite mine is situated at Bogala in Kegalle District.

Major cities

 Kegalle (Municipal Council)

Other towns
 Ambepussa 
 Aranayaka  
 Bulathkohupitiya 
 Dehiovita
 Deraniyagala
 Galigamuwa 
 Hemmathagama
 Karawanella
 Kitulgala
 Kotiyakumbura
 Mawanella
 Rambukkana 
 Ruwanwella
 Thalgaspitiya
 Warakapola 
 Yatiyanthota
 Ganthuna

Demographics

Ethnic distribution (2001 census)
Most of the population are Sinhalese. Indian Tamils brought by the British as indentured labourers to work in tea states makes a significant minority.

Religious groups (2011 census)

Land usage

Notable places
Situated between coastal lowlands and central highlands district has a contrasting landscape.

Elephant Orphanage of Pinnawala
Pinnawela Elephant Orphanage of Pinnawala attracts thousands of tourists daily.

References

 
Districts of Sri Lanka